Novigrad Castle is a castle above Novigrad in Zadar County, Croatia. 

In 1386, the Hungarian and Croatian sovereign Mary and her mother, Elizabeth of Bosnia, were imprisoned in Novigrad Castle. Elizabeth was strangled.

External links
 Fortica Fortress or Castrum Novum - a castle in Novigrad
 Fortica Castle in Novigrad

Castles in Croatia
Buildings and structures in Zadar County